Arthur Dewey Delaney (January 5, 1897 – May 2, 1970) was an American professional baseball pitcher. He played in Major League Baseball (MLB) from 1924 to 1929 for the St. Louis Cardinals and Boston Braves.

References

External links

1897 births
1970 deaths
Major League Baseball pitchers
St. Louis Cardinals players
Boston Braves players
Baseball players from Chicago
Galveston Sand Crabs players
Houston Buffaloes players
Los Angeles Angels (minor league) players
Oakland Oaks (baseball) players
San Francisco Seals (baseball) players